The 2022–23 TCU Horned Frogs women's basketball team represented Texas Christian University in the 2022–23 NCAA Division I women's basketball season. The 2021–22 season is head coach Raegan Pebley's ninth season at TCU. The Horned Frogs are members of the Big 12 Conference and played their home games in Schollmaier Arena.

Previous season
The Horned Frogs finished the season 6–22, 2–16 in Big 12 play to finish in tenth place. In the Big 12 Tournament, they lost to West Virignia in the First Round.  They were not invited to the NCAA tournament or the WNIT.

Offseason

Departures

Incoming

Recruiting
There were no incoming recruiting class for 2022.

Recruiting class of 2023

Roster

Schedule and results 
Source:

|-
!colspan=12 style=| Non-conference regular season

|-
!colspan=12 style=| Big 12 regular season

|-
!colspan=12 style=| Big 12 Women's Tournament

Rankings

The Coaches Poll did not release a Week 2 poll and the AP Poll did not release a poll after the NCAA Tournament.

References 

TCU
TCU Horned Frogs women's basketball seasons
TCU
TCU